Marquis Wen or Marquess Wen may refer to these ancient Chinese rulers:

Marquis Wen of Jin (805–746 BC)
Marquess Wen of Wei (died 396 BC)
Marquess Wen of Han (died 377 BC)

See also
Duke Wen (disambiguation)